Hindy Najman is an American academic specialising in Jewish studies and the Hebrew Bible. Since July 2015, she has been Oriel and Laing Professor of the Interpretation of Holy Scripture at the University of Oxford. Previously, she was Director of the Centre for Jewish Studies at the University of Toronto from 2008 to 2012, and Professor of Religious Studies and Classics at Yale University from 2012 to 2015.

Education
Najman began her higher education at Michlalah, a women's Torah study college in Jerusalem, Israel, from 1984 to 1985. Returning to the United States, she attended Stern College for Women, Yeshiva University, where she majored in English literature and minored in music theory and Jewish studies: she graduated with a Bachelor of Arts (BA) degree in 1990. She taught at a high school from 1990 to 1992. She then became a graduate student at Harvard University, receiving a Master of Arts (MA) degree in 1997 and a Doctor of Philosophy (PhD) degree in 1998. Her doctoral advisor was James Kugel, and her thesis was titled "Authoritative Writing and Interpretation: A Study in the History of Scripture".

Academic career
In 1998, Najman joined the University of Notre Dame as an assistant professor in its Department of Theology. She was awarded the Jordan Kapson Chair in Jewish Studies in 2002 and promoted to associate professor in 2004. In 2004,  she became an associate professor in the Department of Near and Middle Eastern Civilizations of the University of Toronto, which she held concurrently with her Notre Dame post for one year. In 2008, she moved to Toronto's Department for the Study of Religion and became director of its Centre for Jewish Studies. In 2011, she moved to Yale University where she became an associate professor in its Department of Religious Studies and for the Program in Judaic Studies; she held secondary appointments in the Department of Classics and at Yale Divinity School. In 2014, she was promoted to Professor of Religious Studies and Judaic Studies.

In January 2015, it was announced that Najman would be the next Oriel and Laing Professor of the Interpretation of Holy Scripture at the University of Oxford, in succession to John Barton. She took up the post on 1 July 2015, and was elected a Fellow of Oriel College, Oxford. She has also been Director of the Centre for the Study of the Bible at Oriel College since 2017.

Najman was president of the British Association for Jewish Studies from 2019 to 2020.

Selected works

References

 

 
 
 

Living people
Jewish American academics
University of Notre Dame faculty
Academic staff of the University of Toronto
Yale University faculty
Oriel and Laing Professors of the Interpretation of Holy Scripture
Harvard University alumni
Stern College for Women alumni
Fellows of Oriel College, Oxford
Year of birth missing (living people)
Female biblical scholars
21st-century American Jews